WOGR (1540 AM) is a radio station in Charlotte, North Carolina.  The station has an urban gospel radio format with some Christian talk and teaching programs.  It is owned by Victory Christian Center, a charismatic megachurch in Charlotte.
Programming is simulcast on WOGR-FM (93.3) in Salisbury, WGAS (1420 AM) in South Gastonia and FM translator W202BW (88.3 MHz) in Harrisburg. VCC also owns low-powered Christian television station WGTB-CD. Together, these stations are branded as the "Word of God Broadcasting Network" (WordNet), airing from studios at the church's middle school in northwest Charlotte.

WOGR is a daytimer, powered at 2,400 watts, using a directional antenna.  Because AM 1540 is a clear channel frequency reserved for Class A stations KXEL in Waterloo, Iowa and ZNS-1 in Nassau, Bahamas, WOGR must sign-off the air at sunset.

Translators
In addition to the main station and WOGR-FM, WOGR (AM) is relayed by an additional translator to widen its broadcast area.

History
The station was originally constructed and owned by Risden Allen Lyon.  The call sign was WRPL (the initials of Lyon's father, Robert Phillip Lyon).  WRPL signed on in 1964, broadcasting with 1,000 watts, daytime only, from radio studios in a building that Lyon owned at 1402 East Morehead Street in Charlotte, the location of his father's drugstore.  The tower was located near the intersection of Monroe Road and East 5th Street.  Over the years many people referred to WRPL as "Ripple Radio." Formats included soul music, "top pop", soft music, and a format with all female DJs; at the time that format was used, the call letters WSHE were considered. Then WRPL played middle of the road music and then Top 40 again.

WRPL changed to a progressive rock format in the early 1970s that included jazz, "presented in a sophisticated manner", targeting listeners 20 to 40. For the first time, the station was profitable. Calvin Walker, who played progressive rock on WRNA-FM, joined the station April 21, 1973 hosting "Phase II". Walker later filled several roles including the afternoon DJ known as "Calvin". Gil Stamper did the news starting in 1972, and morning host Al Cafaro joined the staff in July 1974. Rhonda Mosley and Digby O'Dell had the midday show, Chris Hensley did early afternoons and the last slot before signoff, and Rick Helms and Wanda Schotz worked weekends. The age of the staff averaged 25. 

This format found much popularity in Charlotte.  Cafaro went on to become Chairman of A&M Records.  Other DJs during that period were Daniel 'This is Daniel' Brunty, Dave Bell and Edward Theodore Faircloth.  Brunty went on to WQDR in Raleigh, North Carolina.  Following 2 years in Afghanistan, where he served as a Sr NATO Advisor to the Afghan Army Communications Directorate, Edward is now a software executive with Xytech Systems in Los Angeles.

Bell was afternoon host when he was one of seven out of 11 full-time employees let go in January 1975, and Cafaro replaced him while still doing mornings. Brunty did middays and production. Faircloth and Chris Hensley were part-time weekend DJs.

Cafaro was hired first as a DJ and salesman and later became general manager. Hensley was program director. Brunty was known for wild stunts such as an imaginary Thanksgiving parade with Henry Kissinger hanging from a balloon, and telling people he was seriously injured and had bionic body parts. Most of the music came from albums and, with few sponsors, the station could play music for 10 or 15 minutes without interruption. In one TV commercial, a disc jockey showed a small stack of 45s and said that represented what other stations played. Then he showed a large stack of 45s and said this was what "The Ripple" played.

In October 1976, WRPL announced it would play classical music on a Sunday morning show hosted by Harold Lynne of New World Records.

WRPL switched to a three-fourths disco and one fourth jazz on January 22, 1979, with progressive rock limited to a Sunday program called "Eclectic Corner".

In October 1979, the station changed its call letters to WQCC. It started a country music format (the call letters stood for "Charlotte Country"). This did not work so a switch to "Charlotte's solid gold radio"  with oldies and beach music took place in April 1980.

The format later evolved into a more 70s-based sound. Then The PTL Club engineer and Heritage Village Church manager Terry White bought a 40 percent interest in the station from Risben Lyon.  On October 13, 1980, WQCC switched to "varied types of Christian music, from hymns to gospel to rock" along with teaching and Christian-oriented news.

The Lyon family sold the radio station in 1983.

WQCC upgraded its signal from 1,000 watts.  On October 3, 1986, Charlotte Mayor Harvey Gantt officially turned on the 10,000-watt transmitter.

Charlotte-based Satellite Radio Network started a 24-hour gospel music service July 4, 1987, with hopes for affiliates across the U.S.  WQCC carried the programming part-time. Satellite Radio Networks of Dallas, Texas later distributed the programming for American Gospel Network.

In the 1990s, with the call letters WOGR, the station added additional signals--WGAS in Gastonia, North Carolina on 1420 AM, and WOGR-FM in Salisbury, North Carolina on 93.3 FM.

Call sign history
The station's call letters were changed to WQCC from WRPL on 11/01/1979, and to WOGR on 03/27/1989.

References

External links
 

OGR
OGR
Radio stations established in 1964
1964 establishments in North Carolina
OGR
Mass media in Charlotte, North Carolina